Gheorghe Lăzăreanu (born 6 May 1924, date of death unknown) was a Romanian footballer who played as a goalkeeper.

Club career
Gheorghe Lăzăreanu played for Ripensia Timișoara, Carmen București, Ciocanul București, ASA București, Dinamo București and Flacăra București, ending his career at 26 years old, choosing to work in constructions. He was the first player that played for both rival teams, ASA București and Dinamo București. On 21 November 1948 he played in the first ever CSCA București - Dinamo București derby.

International career
Gheorghe Lăzăreanu played four matches for Romania, making his debut on 8 October 1946 under coach Virgil Economu in a 2–2 against Bulgaria at the 1946 Balkan Cup.

Scores and results table. Romania's goal tally first:

References

External links
 

1924 births
Year of death missing
Romanian footballers
Romania international footballers
Place of birth missing
Association football goalkeepers
Liga I players
FC Ripensia Timișoara players
FC Carmen București players
FC Steaua București players
FC Dinamo București players
FC Petrolul Ploiești players